The Australian Business Number (ABN) is a unique 11-digit identifier issued by the Australian Business Register (ABR) which is operated by the Australian Taxation Office (ATO). The ABN was introduced on 1 July 2000 by John Howard's Liberal government as part of a major tax reform, which included the introduction of a GST.

The law requires each entity that carries on a business in Australia has an ABN and that the ABN appear on each tax invoice and other tax related documents issued by the entity.

Australian Business Register
The Australian Business Register (ABR) is maintained by the Registrar of the ABR, who is also the Commissioner of Taxation. The Registrar registers entities, issuing them with an ABN, while the Commissioner of Taxation issues the entity a tax file number.

Entitlement to an ABN
The Registrar issues ABNs only to entities that are entitled to an ABN, which can be:
 an individual,
 a body corporate,
 a corporation sole,
 a body politic,
 a partnership,
 any other unincorporated association or body of persons,
 a trust, or
 a superannuation fund.

For an entity to be entitled to an ABN, it must:
 carry on an enterprise in Australia, or
 carry on an enterprise that makes supplies connected with Australia, or
 be a company registered under the Corporations Act 2001 (Cth).

Whether or not an entity is carrying on an enterprise is a question of fact and there are many circumstances where an entity will be carrying on an enterprise. Without being exhaustive, an entity will be carrying on an enterprise if it:
 is in the form of a business,
 leases property,
 is a religious institution,
 is a superannuation fund,
 is an arm of the government, or
 is a charity.

The Registrar can refuse an entity's application to be registered. Equally, the Registrar can cancel an entity's registration and thus their ABN. Each of these decisions are reviewable taxation decisions.

Applying for an ABN
An entity can apply for an ABN:

 online through the Australian Business Register portal,
 using the services of a registered tax agent, or
 lodging a paper-based application with the ATO.

Before applying for an ABN the entity must have a tax file number (TFN).

Format of the ABN
The ABN is an 11-digit number where the first two digits are a checksum. Unlike with the tax file number (TFN), the ATO has publicised the formula for checking and creating valid ABN checksums.  Also, the nature of the ABN algorithm means that any 9-digit number can be made into a valid ABN.

In the case of companies, the ATO determines the ABN by using the company's Australian Company Number (ACN) to which the two-digit checksum is prefixed.

See also 
 Australian Company Number
 Taxation in Australia
 List of company registers

References

External links 
 Australian Business Register
 ABN Information
 ABN Lookup
 Formula of the ABN

National identification numbers
Taxation in Australia
2000 establishments in Australia